Events in the year 1994 in Burkina Faso.

Incumbents 

 President: Blaise Compaoré
 Prime Minister: Youssouf Ouédraogo (until 22 March), Roch Marc Christian Kaboré (from 22 March)

Events 

 March 2 – 18 – Charles L. Abernethy visits the country to write a report for the International Irrigation Management Institute.

Deaths

References 

 
1990s in Burkina Faso
Years of the 20th century in Burkina Faso
Burkina Faso
Burkina Faso